The Cage 2 a 2002 album by guitarist Dario Mollo and former Black Sabbath vocalist Tony Martin. It is their second collaboration.

Track listing

Personnel
Band members
Tony Martin – vocals
Dario Mollo – guitar
Tony Franklin – bass
Roberto Gualdi – drums
Dario Patti – keyboards

Additional performer
Walter Ruta – didjeridoo

Production
Dario Mollo – production, engineering, mastering and mixing
Saverio Chippalone – photography

References

Tony Martin (British singer) albums
Dario Mollo albums
2002 albums